Langdon Academy (formerly Langdon School) is a mixed all-through school with academy status, located on Sussex Road, East Ham in the London Borough of Newham, England.

It is situated in East Ham, close to the junction of the A124 (Barking Road) with the North Circular Road (A406): the school playing fields border on to the A406. This is near the eastern end terminus of the A406 with the A13 in Wallend, close to the boundary of Newham and Barking and Dagenham and Barking Creek. The River Roding runs behind the school in Barking.

Admissions
Langdon Academy is a school for pupils aged 3–16, which admitted its first primary cohort in 2011. A £26 million building works programme has been completed in time for the 2013/14 academic year, in time for the appointment of Principal Chris Mallaband, who left the academy at the end of the spring term. Peter Whittle was the principal between 2014–2018. Now Jamie Brooks is the new principal of the academy.

History
In 1905 a mixed grammar school was opened on Barking Road. East Ham Grammar School for Girls was opened on Plashet Grove in 1932, and this became Plashet School, a separate school, in 1972.

The Langdon buildings were completed in 1953 on former marshland on the eastern border of East Ham with Barking, when administered by the County Borough of East Ham. They consisted of three schools: Burges Manor (girls), Thomas Lethaby (boys) and East Ham Grammar School for Boys. The two secondary modern schools, Burgess Manor and Thomas Lethaby, had been newly formed for the site in 1950/1 but the Grammar School had previously occupied a site at East Ham Town Hall and was founded in 1905. It moved from Barking Road to Langdon Crescent in 1952.

Comprehensive
In 1972 the two secondary modern schools and the boys' grammar school were amalgamated to create a large 12-form entry mixed comprehensive school. Newham created thirteen 11–18 comprehensives, later to dispose of many sixth forms in 1992 except for two faith schools. In September 1998 Langdon School was awarded sports college status by the DFES.

On 12 October 2005 Her Majesty Queen Elizabeth II visited the school and met some children who had been Young Ambassadors to the Olympic vote in Singapore in July of that year.
Former UK Prime Minister Tony Blair also visited in the same year. Visitors from around the world came to visit the school to share in the outstanding progress made there during the Headship of Ms Wiseman, (1992–2009) with the school being awarded three Outstanding grades in OFSTED Inspections, the last being in 2009. Pupils attended the Youth Debate in front of the world leaders assembled for the G8 summit in Gleneagles, Scotland. They also met the former President of South Africa Nelson Mandela at a rally in London to promote the aims of the Milleninum Goals.
Langdon also received many visitors from around the world during this period.

Academy
The school converted to academy status on 1 January 2014 and was renamed Langdon Academy. The school is now sponsored by the Brampton Manor Academy Trust.

Notable former pupils

East Ham Grammar School for Boys
 Barry Bloomfield, President from 1990–2 of the Bibliographical Society
 Sir Norman Browse, President from 1992–95 of the Royal College of Surgeons of England
 Ronnie Boyce, midfielder for West Ham United F.C.
 John Buck, Ambassador to Portugal from 2004–7
 Clive Burr, drummer
 Prof William Harold Joseph Childs FRSE, physicist
 Terrance Dicks, scriptwriter, especially for Doctor Who
 Sir Christopher France, Permanent Secretary from 1992–5 of the Ministry of Defence and from 1987–92 of the Department of Health 
 Roy Hammond, Director from 1979–85 of the City of Birmingham Polytechnic (now Birmingham City University)
 Peter Hucker, goalkeeper for QPR
 Derek Johnson, 800m runner who won silver at the 1956 Melbourne Olympics
 Barrie Keeffe, playwright who wrote The Long Good Friday
 Barry Knight (cricketer), played for Essex
 Wolf Mankowitz, playwright

Langdon Secondary School

 Kane Robinson (Kano) Rapper and Actor
 Kele Le Roc, Singer
 Reece Burke, Hull City defender
 Michael Hector, Fulham defender
 Les Sealey, Retired Professional Footballer
 Izzy Iriekpen, Retired Professional Footballer

Former teachers
 Dame Joan McVittie (Deputy Head Teacher from 1996–98 of Langdon School), President from 2011–12 of the Association of School and College Leaders
 Vanessa Wiseman CBE (Head Teacher from 1992-2009 of Langdon School)

References

External links
 

Secondary schools in the London Borough of Newham
Primary schools in the London Borough of Newham
Academies in the London Borough of Newham
East Ham